Paul Probst may refer to:

 Paul Probst (ice hockey) (born 1950), Swiss ice hockey player
 Paul Probst (sport shooter) (1869–1945), Swiss sport shooter and Olympian